Rihards Kotāns (10 March 1956 – 20 March 2010) was a Latvian bobsledder. He competed in the four man event at the 1984 Winter Olympics, representing the Soviet Union.

References

External links 
 
 
 

1956 births
2010 deaths
Latvian male bobsledders
Olympic bobsledders of the Soviet Union
Bobsledders at the 1984 Winter Olympics